Orchis spitzelii is a species of orchid found from Sweden (Gotland), eastern Spain to the Caucasus and northwestern Africa.

Specifically, it is native to northern Europe (Sweden), central Europe (Austria and possibly extirpated in Germany), southwestern Europe (the Balearic Islands, Corsica, France, and Spain), southeastern Europe (Albania, Bulgaria, Greece, Italy, Crete, and countries of the former Yugoslavia), northern Africa (Algeria and Morocco), western Asia (Iran, Lebanon, Syria, and Turkey), and both the North Caucasus and Transcaucasia.

References

External links 

spitzelii
Orchids of Europe
Flora of North Africa
Flora of Western Asia
Flora of the Caucasus